Developmental Neuropsychology is a peer-reviewed scientific journal covering the intersection of developmental psychology and neuropsychology. It was established in 1985 and is published eight times per year by Routledge. The editor-in-chief is Robert J. McCaffrey (Albany Neuropsychological Associates). According to the Journal Citation Reports, the journal has a 2018 impact factor of 1.344.

See also
Developmental neuropsychology

References

External links

Developmental psychology journals
Neuropsychology journals
Publications established in 1985
English-language journals
Routledge academic journals